"Stompa" is a song performed by Canadian singer/songwriter Serena Ryder. The song was written by Ryder and Jerrod Bettis for Ryder's sixth studio album, Harmony (2012). The song was released as the lead single from the album in September 2012 in Canada, and then in February 2013 in the United States. On February 15, 2013, a French version of the song was released to Canadian iTunes.

Lyrics and composition
Lyrically, the song speaks about how music can be a remedy for most of life's problems — that people should "clappa" their hands and "stompa" their feet. On the track, Ryder said "it's about encouraging people to get outside of their heads and realize that everybody’s got problems and everybody's got issues and life is hard but music can really help you out".

Critical reception
"Stompa" received mostly favorable reviews, with the Montreal Gazette calling the song "infectious" and "almost Broadway-ready", while the Hamilton Spectator praised the fact that the song could be played on four different radio formats (modern rock, hot adult contemporary, contemporary hit radio and adult contemporary). The Toronto Star also took note of the fact that the song had been playlisted on virtually every single commercial radio station in the Toronto market; in the same article, Astral Media executive Rob Farina described the song as "a mashup of The Black Keys and Adele." The New York Times called it "a new song of summer" for 2013.

However, writer Elio Iannacci of the now defunct The Grid gave the song a negative review, saying the song was "hard to forgive" and "easy to forget". 

Was used in a commercial for Cadillac SRX and also used in Grey's Anatomy [20]

Music video   
The official music video for the track premiered on December 21, 2012 on MuchMusic, and was uploaded to Ryder's official VEVO channel on January 23, 2013. In the video, a little girl named Violet portrays a younger Ryder shooting arrows at symbols indicating the four elements. These shots are intercut with other girls shooting arrows, as well as shots of Ryder performing the song with her guitar in a shadowy white room. On the day of its premiere, a behind-the-scenes video was uploaded on MuchMusic's website. In that video, Ryder explained that the video is based on the same idea as her album, that if you separate yourself into one element, you will not succeed; you will only succeed if you bring in all of the elements together.

Release history

Charts

Weekly charts

Year-end charts

Certifications

References

2012 singles
Serena Ryder songs
Songs written by Jerrod Bettis
2012 songs
Songs about music
Songs written by Serena Ryder